Dysgonia leucogramma is a moth of the family Noctuidae first described by George Hampson in 1913. It is found in New Guinea.

References

Dysgonia